Santiago Hernán Villafañe (born 19 May 1988 in Mar del Plata) is an Argentine footballer who plays as a defender, most recently for Thesprotos in Greece.

Career

Boca Juniors
Santiago Hernán Villafañe began his playing career in Argentina with Boca Juniors, with whom he debuted in the First Division. A predominantly left sided player, he is known for his tough tackling and speed.

Real Madrid Castilla

In 2007, he joined Real Madrid from Boca Juniors,  where he played as a wingback or midfielder for Real Madrid Castilla. Villafañe trained with the first team on several occasions but did not play for Real Madrid in La Liga.

Boca Juniors, return
In 2009 Villafañe returned to Boca Juniors.

FC Midtjylland
In July 2012 he signed a five-year contract with the Danish Superliga-side FC Midtjylland.

RNK Split
In summer 2016, he signed for the Croatian club of RNK Split, in order to help the team to achieve the team's wish to win the Croatian First Football League.

Montana
On 23 February 2017, Villafañe signed with Bulgarian club Montana until the rest of the season.

Ruch Chorzów
On 18 July 2017, Villafañe signed a 1-year contract with Polish I liga side Ruch Chorzów with an option for a further year.

References

External links
 
Santiago Villafañe – Argentine Primera statistics at Fútbol XXI 

1988 births
Living people
Sportspeople from Mar del Plata
Argentine footballers
Association football defenders
Boca Juniors footballers
Real Madrid Castilla footballers
Independiente Rivadavia footballers
FC Midtjylland players
Lyngby Boldklub players
Panthrakikos F.C. players
OFI Crete F.C. players
RNK Split players
FC Montana players
Ruch Chorzów players
Argentine Primera División players
Danish Superliga players
Super League Greece players
Croatian Football League players
First Professional Football League (Bulgaria) players
I liga players
Argentine expatriate footballers
Argentine expatriate sportspeople in Spain
Expatriate footballers in Spain
Expatriate men's footballers in Denmark
Expatriate footballers in Greece
Expatriate footballers in Croatia
Expatriate footballers in Bulgaria
Expatriate footballers in Poland
Argentine expatriate sportspeople in Greece
Argentine expatriate sportspeople in Croatia
Argentine expatriate sportspeople in Bulgaria
Argentine expatriate sportspeople in Poland